Will Harvey's Music Construction Set (MCS) is a music composition notation program designed by Will Harvey for the Apple II and published by Electronic Arts in 1983. Harvey wrote the original Apple II version in assembly language when he was 15 and in high school. MCS was conceived as a tool to add music to his previously published game, an abstract shooter called Lancaster for the Apple II.

Music Construction Set was ported to the Atari 8-bit family, Commodore 64, IBM PC (as a booter), and the Atari ST. Two years later, in 1986, Will Harvey released a port for the 16-bit Apple IIGS, utilizing its advanced sound. Also that year, a redesigned version for the Amiga and Macintosh was released as Deluxe Music Construction Set.

Overview
With MCS, a user can create musical composition via a graphical user interface, a novel concept at the time of its release. Users can drag and drop notes right onto the staff, play back their creations through the computer's speakers, and print them out. The program comes with a few popular songs as samples. Most versions of this program require the users to use a joystick to create their songs, note by note.

The original Apple II version supports the Mockingboard expansion card for higher fidelity sound output. In addition, use of the Mockingboard allows the musical staff to scroll along with the music as notes are played. Without it, the Apple II can't update the display while playback is in progress.

Ports
Electronic Arts ported MCS from the original Apple II version to the Atari 8-bit family, IBM PC, and the Commodore 64. The Atari 8-bit and Commodore 64 versions use the multi-channel audio hardware of those systems.

The IBM PC version allows output audio via the IBM PC Model 5150's cassette port, so 4-voice music can be sent to a stereo system. It also takes advantage of the 3-voice sound chip built into the IBM PCjr and Tandy 1000.

The Apple IIGS version was done by the original programmer, Will Harvey, in 1986. This port takes advantage of the built-in Ensoniq wavetable sample-based synthesizer, offering over thirty instruments to choose from (sixteen are digitized and thus realistic sounding), however only two instruments can be selected per song. It supports up to 15 simultaneous voices, stereo audio and MIDI-output. A port of Deluxe Music Construction was also written, scheduled to be in stores by late 1987, but never released.

The version of Music Construction Set for the Atari ST is not a port and shares no source code with the original versions. It was written by Richard J. Plom for Intersect Software Corporation under the name The Orchestrator. It was acquired from Intersect Software by Electronic Arts and rebranded Music Construction Set in 1987.  The Atari ST version is the first version to have supported the new MIDI standard, with this computer's built-in MIDI hardware.

The program was completely redesigned for the Amiga and Macintosh and renamed Deluxe Music Construction Set. This version has more features, including lyrics and support for IFF SMUS files.

Reception
II Computing listed Music Construction Set third on the magazine's list of top Apple II education software as of late 1985, based on sales and market-share data. Music Construction Set sold over a million units. Ahoy! stated that despite some limitations, Music Construction Set for the Commodore 64 "will aid both experienced songwriters and dedicated novices alike. It's a powerful music processor and a joy to use".

See also
 Pinball Construction Set, EA's first program with "Construction Set" in the title from 1983.
 Bank Street Music Writer

References

1984 software
Apple II software
Atari 8-bit family software
Atari ST software
Commodore 64 software
Electronic Arts
Scorewriters
Assembly language software